The Estonia men's national basketball team represents Estonia in international basketball matches. They are controlled by the Estonian Basketball Association. The team competed in their first international tournament at the 1936 Olympic Games. Estonia has also qualified for the EuroBasket six times overall, with their best results coming in 1937 and 1939. However, after 1939, Estonia halted national team activities due to the occupation of the Baltic states during World War II. Estonia would later rejoin FIBA in 1991, after regaining independence from the Soviet Union.

History

Early years (1920s–1930s)
Estonia played their first ever international match against their Baltic neighbors Latvia, on 29 April 1924, a 20–16 defeat in Riga. Ten years later, on 30 November 1934, Estonia would become a member of FIBA. Two years after that, the national team played in their first international tournament at the 1936 Olympic Games, held in Berlin. It was the first Olympic tournament to hold basketball as an official medal event. Led by head coach Herbert Niiler, Estonia played their opening match of the tournament against France, where the team came away with a 34–29 win. The national team lost their subsequent second round game to the United States 28–52, but passed the consolation round and faced the Philippines in the third round, losing 22–39.

Estonia participated at the European Basketball Championship for the first time in 1937. The team won its first game against Egypt 44–15, but failed to advance past the group stage after suffering a 15–20 defeat against Lithuania, and a 20–30 defeat against Italy. Estonia would finish out the rest of the tournament to place fifth in the final rankings, after defeating Czechoslovakia 30–20 and Latvia 41–19.

Two years later at the EuroBasket 1939, the tournament used a different format from the previous championship, with eight teams facing off in a round-robin competition. Estonia would finish the tournament with a (4–3) record and once again finished in fifth place at the event. Heino Veskila was the tournament's scoring leader averaging 16.7 points per game.

In 1940, Estonia was occupied by the Soviet Union and the team was disbanded.

National team restored (1990s)
After the restoration of independence, the Estonian Basketball Association rejoined FIBA in 1991. The team successfully qualified for EuroBasket 1993, held in Germany. Despite missing star players Martin Müürsepp and Tiit Sokk, the team, coached by Jaak Salumets won their group in the preliminary round, finishing ahead of Slovenia, Belgium, and hosts and eventual champions Germany. In the second round, Estonia finished third in their group and advanced to the quarter-finals, where the team lost to Russia 61–82 to be eliminated. In the classification rounds, Estonia defeated Bosnia and Herzegovina 99–91 and lost to Spain 80–119, finishing the championship in sixth place with a (6–5) record. Aivar Kuusmaa was the team's scoring leader with 19.9 points per game.

2000s–2010s

Estonia once again qualified for the EuroBasket, after failing to qualify for the tournament on three occasions after 1993. The team went (7–3) during the qualification period to reach EuroBasket 2001, held in Turkey. Coached by Üllar Kerde, Estonia lost all three of their preliminary round matches against Germany, FR Yugoslavia and Croatia, failing to advance past the group stage and finishing the championship with a disappointing (0–3) record and a 14th place finish. Martin Müürsepp led the team in scoring with 18.3 points per game, while Margus Metstak collected 6.0 rebounds per game, and Rauno Pehka and Tanel Tein averaged 2.7 assists per game. After 2001, Estonia failed to qualify for another major international basketball tournament for 14 years. Although the team competed at the second tier Division B competition in 2011, winning their group.

Coached by Tiit Sokk, Estonia qualified for EuroBasket 2015, with preliminary round matches held in Riga, Latvia. Estonia's first two performances were poor as the team suffered heavy defeats in matches against Czech Republic 57–80 and Belgium 55–84. However, the team bounced back with a 78–71 victory over Ukraine, their first EuroBasket victory since 1993. The next game saw Estonia defeated in a close game by Lithuania 62–64. In their final group phase match, Estonia were up against Latvia, which resulted in a 64–75 loss and failing to advance to the knockout stage. Estonia finished the championship in 20th place with a (1–4) record. Gregor Arbet was the team's scoring leader at 11.6 points per game, while Siim-Sander Vene averaged 6.4 rebounds and Sten Sokk contributed 4.2 assists per game.

In qualification for EuroBasket 2017, Estonia won their first two games against, Belarus, and Portugal to put the team at a record of (2–0). However, Estonia would drop three of their final four matches to eliminate the team from qualifying.

After missing their opportunity to reach EuroBasket 2017, Estonia turned their focus toward qualifying for the 2019 FIBA World Cup. The team first went through European Pre-Qualifiers, where they accumulated a (3–1) record during the process, to advance. Entering the first round of European Qualifiers, Estonia would split their first four matches for a record of (2–2), before losing their final two games to Great Britain and Greece respectively. Although by defeating Great Britain in their first match of the qualifiers between the two, it proved enough for Estonia to move on to the second and final phase of European qualifiers. There, the team lost their first four games of the round, before managing to salvage their final two matches before being eliminated. In October 2019, the Estonian Basketball Association named Jukka Toijala as the new head coach of the national team.

2020s
Estonia competed in the EuroBasket 2022 with group phase games played in Milan, Italy. The team started the tournament with a 62–83 loss to the hosts, followed by two narrow defeats against Ukraine (73–74) and Croatia (70–73). Estonia then won 94–62 against Great Britain before losing to Greece 69–90. The team failed to advance to the round of 16 and finished the tournament in 19th place. Maik-Kalev Kotsar averaged the team-best 12.2 points and 5.6 rebounds per game, while Kerr Kriisa led the team with 5.8 assists per game.

Competitive record

FIBA World Cup

Olympic Games

EuroBasket

Results and fixtures

2021

2022

2023

Team

Current roster
Roster for the 2023 FIBA World Cup Qualifiers matches on 24 and 27 February 2023 against Slovenia and Sweden.

Depth chart

Notable players
Current notable players who have played for the national team:

|}

|valign="top" |
 Legend
Club – describes lastclub on 1 February 2023
Age – describes ageon 1 February 2023
|}

Coaches

Past rosters
1936 Olympic Games: finished 9th among 23 teams

3 Erich Altosaar, 4 Artur Amon, 5 Aleksander Illi, 6 Vladimir Kärk, 8 Robert Keres, 9 Evald Mahl, 10 Aleksander Margiste, 11 Bernhard Nooni, 12 Leonid Saar, 13 Heino Veskila, 14 Georg Vinogradov (Coach: Herbert Niiler)

1937 EuroBasket: finished 5th among 8 teams

3 Oskar Erikson, 4 Aleksander Illi, 5 Vladimir Kärk, 6 Robert Keres, 7 Evald Mahl, 8 Albert Suurna, 9 Heino Veskila, 10 Ralf Viksten, 11 Alfred Zimmermann (Coach: Herbert Niiler)

1939 EuroBasket: finished 5th among 8 teams

3 Valdeko Valdmäe, 4 Oskar Erikson, 5 Herbert Tillemann, 6 Ralf Viksten, 7 Georg Vinogradov, 8 Artur Amon, 9 Hans Juurup, 10 Erich Altosaar, 11 Heino Veskila, 13 Evald Mahl (Coach: Herbert Niiler)

1993 EuroBasket: finished 6th among 16 teams

4 Toomas Kandimaa, 5 Aivar Kuusmaa, 6 Erki Kivinukk, 7 Ivo Saksakulm, 8 Margus Metstak, 9 Andrus Nagel, 10 Indrek Rumma, 11 Sergei Babenko, 12 Marek Noormets, 13 Aleksandr Karavajev, 14 Gert Kullamäe, 15 Rauno Pehka (Coach: Jaak Salumets)

2001 EuroBasket: finished 14th among 16 teams

4 Tanel Tein, 5 Indrek Varblane, 6 Toomas Kandimaa, 7 Valmo Kriisa, 8 Margus Metstak, 9 Andre Pärn, 10 Indrek Rumma, 11 Tarmo Kikerpill, 12 Marek Noormets, 13 Martin Müürsepp, 14 Toomas Liivak, 15 Rauno Pehka (Coach: Üllar Kerde)

2015 EuroBasket: finished 20th among 24 teams

4 Rain Veideman, 5 Tanel Sokk, 6 Gert Dorbek, 7 Sten Sokk, 8 Janar Talts, 9 Gregor Arbet, 10 Erik Keedus, 11 Siim-Sander Vene, 13 Joosep Toome, 14 Kristjan Kangur, 15 Reinar Hallik, 20 Tanel Kurbas (Coach: Tiit Sokk)

2022 EuroBasket: finished 19th among 24 teams

0 Henri Drell, 2 Sander Raieste, 7 Sten Sokk, 9 Matthias Tass, 11 Siim-Sander Vene, 15 Maik-Kalev Kotsar, 20 Rauno Nurger, 21 Janari Jõesaar, 22 Martin Dorbek, 33 Kristjan Kitsing, 44 Kerr Kriisa, 77 Kristian Kullamäe (Coach: Jukka Toijala)

See also

Sport in Estonia
Estonia women's national basketball team
Estonia men's national under-20 basketball team
Estonia men's national under-18 basketball team
Estonia men's national under-16 basketball team
Estonia men's national 3x3 team

References

External links

 
Estonian Basketball Association website 
Estonia FIBA profile 
Estonia National Team – Men at Eurobasket.com
Estonia Basketball Records at FIBA Archive

Basketball in Estonia
Men's national basketball teams
Basketball, men
National sports teams established in 1924
Estonia national basketball team